Rosine Elisabeth Menthe (nicknamed: Madame Rudolphine; 17 May 1663, in Brunswick – 20 May 1701, in Brunswick, Germany), was married morganatically with Duke Rudolph Augustus of Brunswick-Wolfenbüttel (1627–1704), Duke of Brunswick-Lüneburg and Prince of Brunswick-Wolfenbüttel.

Life 
Rosine Elisabeth was born the daughter of a barber and surgeon from Brunswick, Franz Joachim Menthe. In 1681 she married Rudolf August (1627–1704), the Duke of Brunswick-Wolfenbüttel.  Rudolph Augustus had been married in his first marriage with the Countess Christiane Elisabeth of Barby (1634–1681); she had died on 2 May 1681.  On 7 June 1681 or 7 July 1681, the Duke married Rosine, who had just turned eighteen.  They married in Hedwigsburg, near Wolffenbüttel.  The Duke's younger brother Anthony Ulrich and his Chancellor Philipp Ludwig Probst von Wendhausen were present.

She did not receive a title during her twenty-year marriage to the duke; she was simply called Madame Rudolphine.  We find this name in a letter from Electress Sophia of Hannover to Gottfried Wilhelm Leibniz of 18 August 1700. Children from this marriage would, according to an agreement Duke Rudloph Augustus made with his brother and co-ruler Anthony Ulrich, not receive a title either, but would receive "maintenance appropriate for a noble person".  The marriage, however, remained childless.

In 1695, the Duke ordered his royal architect Hermann Korb to expand the Wasserburg castle at Vechelde near Brunswick into the royal Vechelde Palace.  They would use the Madamenweg, which was named after her, to travel to Vechelde Palace from the Gray Court in downtown Brunswick.

Elisabeth Rosine Menthe died in 1701 at the Gray Court in Brunswick.

References and sources 
 Elisabeth E. Kwan, Anna E. Röhrig: Frauen vom Hof der Welfen, Verlag Matrixmedia, Göttingen, 2006, 
 
 Carl Eduard Vehse: Geschichte der Höfe des Hauses Braunschweig, part 5: Die Hofhaltungen zu Hannover, London und Braunschweig, Verlag Hoffmann und Campe, Hamburg, 1853
 Johann Stephan Pütter: Über Mißheirathen teutscher Fürsten und Grafen, Verlag Vandenhoeck und Ruprecht, Göttingen, 1796.

Footnotes

External links 
 Portrait of Elisabeth Rosine Menthe on the website of the Virtual Print Room of the Duke Anton Ulrich Museum Brunswick and the Herzog August Library in Wolfenbüttel (Retrieved 16 May 2010)

1663 births
1701 deaths
Rosine
Nobility from Braunschweig
17th-century German people
Morganatic spouses of German royalty
Burials at Brunswick Cathedral